RHEM is an adventure game from Knut Müller and Got Game Entertainment.  It is distributed as a Macromedia Director file.  The player explores a barren, maze-like landscape of water ponds, walkways, and brick buildings with the aid of a partial map.  The game has several puzzles involving machines and symbols. There are three sequels, called RHEM 2: The Cave, RHEM 3: The Secret Library and RHEM 4: The Golden Fragments.

RHEM, like Myst, is made up of a series of static images.

The object of the game is to locate four pieces of a letter, which must be pieced together.

Plot
The player enters the city of RHEM on a railway car. The car goes into a dead-end station with a rotatable track.  The player is unable to leave because the track is not yet rotated.  While the player is on his way to the switch to rotate the station track, a previous prisoner of RHEM beats the player to the switch he was after and leaves in the player's railway car.  The player must then wander the city of Rhem in search of a second railway station.

Each of the quarters of the letter is located in a different area not shown on the map provided in the game's package.

Production
According to Müller, the following development tools are used to develop RHEM

Graphics:
Bryce 2-6
StrataVision 3D
Silo
Amorphium
Final Cut Pro
Motion

Sound:
SoundEdit
Peak
Logic Pro

Scripting:
Macromedia Director

Reception

RHEM received "mixed" reviews according to the review aggregation website Metacritic. Robert Gerbino of GameZone praised its similarity to Myst in terms of its puzzles but criticized the graphics and repetitive gameplay.

References

External links
 http://www.rhem-game.com/en/rhem1/index.htm
 

2002 video games
Adventure games
First-person adventure games
Classic Mac OS games
MacOS games
Video games developed in Germany
Windows games
Got Game Entertainment games
Single-player video games